Poor Valley is a valley in Grainger County, Tennessee, Hawkins County, Tennessee, Hancock County, Tennessee, Scott County, Virginia, Washington County, Virginia, and Smyth County, Virginia, United States. A variant name is Big Poor Valley. 

Poor Valley was named from the poor soil found there.

A 1,900-2,200 acre portion of the valley in western Hawkins County was proposed and planned as state park known as Poor Valley State Park in order to promote economic development efforts in the upper East Tennessee region, the plan would stall in the 1970s.

References

Valleys of Tennessee
Valleys of Virginia
Landforms of Grainger County, Tennessee
Landforms of Hawkins County, Tennessee
Landforms of Hancock County, Tennessee
Landforms of Scott County, Virginia
Landforms of Washington County, Virginia
Landforms of Smyth County, Virginia